Branding Broadway is a 1918 American silent Western film directed by and starring William S. Hart, written by C. Gardner Sullivan, and produced by Thomas H. Ince and Hart.

Plot
A tough cowboy, Robert Sands (played by William S. Hart) is banished from an Arizona town for his drunk and disorderly comment.  He moves to New York and gets a job as bodyguard and guardian to a wealthy and spoiled young man.  He falls in love with a restaurant owner (played by Seena Owen) who has compromising letters from the young man Sands is charged with protecting.

Cast

Reception
Like many American films of the time, Branding Broadway was subject to restrictions and cuts by city and state film censorship boards. For example, the Chicago Board of Censors required, in Reel 1, that four scenes of Sands and his gang shooting up town be reduced by half, and cuts of three cafe fight scenes and, in Reel 5, all but the first and last scenes of the attack on the young woman.

Preservation status
The film is preserved in the Museum of Modern Art (MOMA for short) collection in New York.

References

External links

 
 
 Lobby poster (Caratulan)

1918 films
1918 Western (genre) films
American black-and-white films
Silent American Western (genre) films
Films directed by William S. Hart
1910s English-language films
1910s American films